The Hyper CD-ROM is an optical data storage device similar to the CD-ROM with a multilayer 3D structure, invented by Romanian scientist Dr. Eugen Pavel.

The technology is similar to FMD discs. The bit of data being held as a change in fluorescence characteristics once irradiated with one or two lasers. The target is irradiated with a pulse of laser(s) then a CCD or photodiode wait for an emitted light by the medium due to the Fluorescence effect (bit value set to "1" if emitted, else "0").

Characteristics 

The disc has a height of 1.2 mm and a diameter of 120 mm and can be produced with existing technology.

It uses fluorescent photosensitive material (glass enhanced with rare earth or vitroceramic enhanced with photosensitizing metals) as storage medium.

 Capacity: 1 PB (with possibility of extension up to 100 EB)
 Medium transfer rate: 300 Mbit/s (may be more)
 Hard drive dimensions: 80 x 150 x 300 mm
 Disk dimensions: 1.2 mm ø 120 mm
 Temperature resistance: up to 550 °C
 High reliability
 Maximum usage period: 5 000 years

In November 1999, the disk was presented at EUREKA "48th World exhibition of Innovation and New Technology" in Brussels.

The technology has gained recognition in 21 countries including the U.S., the EU, Canada, Japan and Israel.

There has not been any large-scale production of the Hyper CD-ROM, although several firms like IBM, Compaq, Philips and other Hollywood businesses have taken an interest in this form of data storage.

References

External links
 Storex Technologies, the Company producing the disc.

 Press Release, about 1PB optical disc.

Video storage
Vaporware
Audio storage
120 mm discs
Rotating disc computer storage media
Romanian inventions